is a Japanese manga series written and illustrated by Tomo Matsumoto. It was serialized in Hakusensha's  manga magazine LaLa from 2002 to 2004, with its chapters collected into five  volumes. Beauty is the Beast is licensed in English by Viz Media's Shojo Beat imprint.

Characters

A bubbly, young 11th-grader that moves into the school dormitory. Loves to give nicknames, such as Wanichin (Wanibuchi).  She is quite dense to many situations (especially to expressions of love from Satoshi). At the end of the manga we see a girl who looks very much like Eimi say that her parents met at the school and fell in love there.

Eimi's roommate. Loves the female body, and even has a poster plastered on her wall, with dancing ladies.  She later became a receptionist.

A girl who lives in the dorms, and is friends with Eimi. Considered a "ladies' woman" because of her boyish looks, but she is oblivious to it.  Later she becomes a quite successful architect. She is drawn to cute things, especially cute underwear.

One of Eimi's friends that lives in the men's dorm. People think of him as a dangerous person at first glance, but he has a deeper side to him. For eight years he lived with his grandfather in Mexico. Wanibuchi harbours a deep hatred for his father.  In order to cover up his own guilt of his younger sister's death, Wanibuchi blames his father's negligence. He later marries Eimi and they have a daughter. He also works as a hotel manager. Wanibuchi is known for his ability for fixing electrical and sewage materials. Wanibuchi's daughter has the appearance of Eimi but her personality is similar to his.

A guy from the boy's dormitory who falls in love with Eimi in volume 3. He is often jealous of Wanibuchi because Eimi is very affectionate towards him. Nicknamed "Simone" by Eimi.  He is quite serious with everything he does rather with his studies or Eimi. He later joins a newspaper company after graduating from Tokyo University.

The roommate of Wanibuchi, Inui is pretty laid back. Suzu likes him, but it's not positive whether he likes her back or not. He entered biological research school after graduation, nicknamed Nuinui by Eimi.

Publication
Beauty is the Beast premiered in the July 2002 issue of Hakusensha's  manga magazine LaLa on May 24, 2002. Its final chapter was published in the magazine's February 2005 issue on December 24, 2004. The series was collected into five  volumes published by Hakusensha's Hana to Yume Comics imprint. It is licensed in English by Viz Media's Shojo Beat imprint.

Volumes list

Japanese
  released on January 6, 2003
  released on August 4, 2003
  released on March 5, 2004
  released on November 5, 2004
  released on March 5, 2005

English
  released on November 6, 2005
  released on February 6, 2006
  released on May 2, 2006
  released on August 1, 2006
  released on November 7, 2006

Reception
Paul Dale Roberts from Manga Life said Beauty is the Beast is "a story that women and girls should enjoy", but he found himself "getting sleepy in some parts of the story". Julie Rosato from Mania Entertainment commented that the artwork "is pretty typical for shoujo works, with nothing particularly outstanding about it." Rosato compared the series with Here is Greenwood, but "while it shares with Greenwood plenty of quirky characters and a quiet, nearly sneaky wit, it so far lacks the same charm." She also can't "quite tell if the focus of this story is supposed to be on the various (and sometimes romantic) adventures of the wacky dorm-mates or if it will be on the painfully clumsy love developing between Eimi and Wanibuchi."

Writing for IGN, Jessica Chobot noted that "although [it is] focused primarily on the relationship between Eimi and Wanibuchi, Beauty is the Beast is a collection of off-kilter love stories, bringing to light all the adventures amongst the students at Seikei Academy in a lighthearted and charming manner." Chobot praised the artwork, "although the lack of solid blacks and overuse of similar toned grays cause the illustrations to look floaty and not solid. However, emotions are well-conveyed through the use of line work." In 2005, Beauty is the Beast was listed by IGN as the tenth best  manga released in English.

References

External links
 Beauty is the Beast on the Shojo Beat website (defunct; link via the Wayback Machine)
 

2002 manga
Hakusensha manga
Romance anime and manga
Shōjo manga
Viz Media manga